Mathew Kuzhalnadan is an Indian politician from Kerala and a member of the Indian National Congress. He represents Muvattupuzha constituency in the Kerala Legislative Assembly.
Dr. Mathew Kuzhalnadan has had experience at the Bar and has practiced in Courts and Tribunals across the country during the course of which he has dealt with cases in diverse areas of law. Dr. Kuzhalnadan earned his doctorate in “Regional Trade Agreements” from the Jawaharlal Nehru University, New Delhi.  Dr. Kuzhalnadan is a prolific writer and has contributed several articles in leading newspapers. He is also involved in national politics and was Kerala State President of the All India Professionals Congress. He has also been appointed the General Secretary of the KPCC.

References

Indian National Congress politicians from Kerala
Living people
Kerala MLAs 2021–2026
1977 births